AIIA may refer to:
 Australian Information Industry Association
 Australian Institute of International Affairs, a think tank
 Quorum-quenching N-acyl-homoserine lactonase, an enzyme